Six Days is a 1923 American silent drama film directed by Charles Brabin and starring Corinne Griffith, Frank Mayo and Myrtle Stedman. It is based on a novel of the same title by Elinor Glyn.

Cast
 Corinne Griffith as Laline Kingston
 Frank Mayo as Dion Leslie
 Myrtle Stedman as Olive Kingston
 Claude King as Lord Charles Chetwyn
 Maude George as Clara Leslie
 Spottiswoode Aitken as Pere Jerome
 Charles Clary as Richard Kingston
 Evelyn Walsh Hall as Hon. Emily Tarrant-Chetwyn
 Paul Cazeneuve as Chef
 Jack Herbert as Guide
 Robert DeVilbiss as Dion Leslie, age six

References

Bibliography
 Munden, Kenneth White. The American Film Institute Catalog of Motion Pictures Produced in the United States, Part 1. University of California Press, 1997.

External links
 

1923 films
1923 drama films
1920s English-language films
American silent feature films
Silent American drama films
American black-and-white films
Films directed by Charles Brabin
Goldwyn Pictures films
Films based on British novels
1920s American films